Brian "Doggy" Dawson (born 12 December 1968) is an English professional darts player currently playing in Professional Darts Corporation (PDC) events.

Career
Dawson began to see success in the 2014–15 season as he qualified for the televised stages of the Winmau World Masters, losing narrowly to Glen Durrant after having match darts. Dawson then debuted at the World Championship and reached the quarter-finals, after victories against Seigo Asada, Madars Razma, and Jeffrey de Graaf. He was eventually defeated by fourth seed Scott Mitchell, who went on to win the tournament.

World Championship results

BDO
 2015: Quarter-finals (lost to Scott Mitchell 2–5)
 2016: 2nd round (lost to Jeff Smith 1–4)
 2017: 1st round (lost to Jeff Smith 2–3)

Performance timeline

References

External links
http://www.dartsdatabase.co.uk/PlayerDetails.aspx?playerKey=5335

1968 births
Living people
English darts players
British Darts Organisation players